Leo George Biedermann (born October 19, 1955) is a former American football tackle. He played for the Cleveland Browns in 1978.

References

1955 births
Living people
Sportspeople from Omaha, Nebraska
Players of American football from Nebraska
American football tackles
California Golden Bears football players
Cleveland Browns players
Montreal Concordes players
Oakland Invaders players